Morrison Lake is a lake in Muskoka District, Ontario, Canada. There is also a Wetland Conservation Reserve located on the west of the lake. It is a rather large lake with a number of islands within, amongst these are Mile Island, Betula Island, Belle Isle, Ida Isle and Otiosus.

See also
List of lakes in Ontario

References
 National Resources Canada

Lakes of the District Municipality of Muskoka